Konstantinos Tsimikas (born 12 May 1996) is a Greek professional footballer who plays as a left-back for Premier League club Liverpool and the Greece national team.

Tsimikas previously played for Olympiacos, and also had loan spells with Esbjerg and Willem II.

Club career

Early career
Tsimikas was born in Thessaloniki, and hails from the village of Lefkonas, Serres. He started his career from his village's local team and he transferred to AS Neapoli Thessaloniki when he was 14 years old. In 2013, he moved to Panserraikos and he scored 5 goals during 2013–14 season in Gamma Ethniki.

Olympiacos
Tsimikas made his Olympiacos debut in the Super League in a match against AEL Kalloni on 19 December 2015.

Loan to Esbjerg
On 28 December 2016, Tsimikas signed for Danish club Esbjerg on a loan until the end of the 2016–17 season. On 17 February 2017, in his debut with the club, he scored a goal in a 3–0 home win game against SønderjyskE Fodbold. He left the club after 13 games, and returned to Olympiacos.

Loan to Willem II
On 30 June 2017, Tsimikas made another loan move, this time to Dutch club Willem II on a season-long contract. He was a regular in the 2017–18 Eredivisie, starting 32 of the 34 matches, and also scored 5 goals. In the quarter-finals of the KNVB Cup, his deflected free kick took the tie into extra time, and Willem II went on to beat Roda on penalties. Tsimikas' spectacular bicycle kick in a 3–2 win against FC Utrecht was voted Voetbal International Goal of the Month and contributed to his being named Eredivisie Rookie of the Month for March 2018.

Return to Olympiacos
Coach Pedro Martins kept Tsimikas at Olympiacos for the 2018–19 season. In November 2018, he crossed for Kostas Fortounis' first goal in a 5–1 defeat of F91 Dudelange in the Europa League group stage; both players were named in the UEFA Europa League Team of the Week. In late 2018 he did not start many games but was still offered a new deal, keeping Tsimikas at the club until the summer of 2023.

Liverpool

On 11 August 2020, Tsimikas signed for Liverpool on a deal for reported fee of £11.75 million. He became just the second Greek footballer to become a Liverpool player after Sotirios Kyrgiakos who joined the club from AEK Athens in 2009. He made his debut for Liverpool in the EFL Cup on 24 September 2020, against Lincoln City in a 7–2 win. He made his Premier League debut as a substitute for Andrew Robertson against Manchester City in a 4–1 loss.

On 14 August 2021, he made his first league start in the 3–0 away win against Norwich City on the opening weekend of the season. He followed this up with a man-of-the-match performance on 21 August, providing the assist for Diogo Jota's goal in a 2–0 win over Burnley.

On 13 April 2022, at the quarter-finals of the 2021–22 UEFA Champions League against Benfica, Tsimikas provided two assists in a 3–3 draw, helping Liverpool to secure their place in the semi-finals. He was named Player of the Match.

On 14 May 2022, Liverpool faced Chelsea in the FA Cup final at Wembley. With the game having finished 0–0 after 90 minutes, Tsimikas came off the bench in the 111th minute to replace the injured Robertson. Liverpool then won penalty shoot-out 6–5, with Tsimikas scoring the deciding penalty. He said afterwards, "The boss asked me which number (penalty) I want, and I said number seven. He asked 'why so far?'. I said 'I just want number seven' and it gave me the opportunity to win the game. I chose the right side and scored."

International career
Tsimikas received his first call-up to the Greece senior team for the 2018–19 UEFA Nations League matches against Hungary and Finland in October 2018. He made his international debut in the starting eleven for the match at home to Hungary on 12 October, and crossed for Kostas Mitroglou to score the only goal of the game.

Career statistics

Club

International

Honours
Olympiacos
Super League Greece: 2015–16, 2019–20
Greek Cup: 2019–20

Liverpool
FA Cup: 2021–22
EFL Cup: 2021–22
UEFA Champions League: runner up: 2021–22

Individual
 Eredivisie Talent of the Month: March 2018
Greek Football Player of the Year: 2019–20
Super League Greece Team of the Year: 2019–20

References

External links

Profile at the Liverpool F.C. website

1996 births
Living people
People from Lefkonas
Footballers from Thessaloniki
Greek footballers
Association football defenders
Olympiacos F.C. players
Esbjerg fB players
Willem II (football club) players
Liverpool F.C. players
Super League Greece players
Eredivisie players
Premier League players
FA Cup Final players
Greece youth international footballers
Greece under-21 international footballers
Greece international footballers
Greek expatriate footballers
Expatriate men's footballers in Denmark
Expatriate footballers in England
Expatriate footballers in the Netherlands
Greek expatriate sportspeople in Denmark
Greek expatriate sportspeople in England
Greek expatriate sportspeople in the Netherlands